General elections were held in Basutoland on 29 April 1965. The result was a narrow victory for the Basotholand National Party, which led the country to independence as Lesotho on 4 October the following year. Voter turnout was 62.8%.

Results

References

Basutoland
Elections in Lesotho
General election
1965 election